Dunstan Vella (born 27 April 1996) is a Maltese professional footballer who plays as a midfielder for Hibernians.

Career
Vella has played club football for Hibernians.

He made his international debut for Malta in August 2018.

References

External links
 

1996 births
Living people
Maltese footballers
Malta youth international footballers
Malta under-21 international footballers
Malta international footballers
Hibernians F.C. players
Maltese Premier League players
Association football midfielders